MTV Fanaah is an Indian thriller television miniseries broadcast by MTV India. It premiered on 21 July 2014. Produced by BBC Worldwide India, MTV Fanaah is about the complexities of a love story featuring supernatural entities such as vampires and werewolves. The second season of the show started airing on 25 October 2014 and ended on 22 January 2015

Cast

 Ahsaas Channa as Young Dhara
 Harsh Mehta as young Vivaan
 Chetna Pande as Dhara
 Karan Kundra as Vivaan
 Nakul Sahdev/Yuvraj Thakur as Anshuman 
 Anita Hassanandani as Preet 
 Vishal Gandhi as Adhrij
 Anupam Bhattacharya as Abhimanyu
 Rohan Shah as Adwik
 Aaradhna Uppal as Farida
 Sandit Tiwari as Vivan's Brother-in-law 
 Nikita Sharma as Mahi 
 Rithvik Dhanjani as Vidhyut
 Ratan Rajput as Iravati
 Chetna Pande as Avni
 Yuvraj Thakur as Sarthak
 Anita Hassanandani as Yamini
 Ayaz Ahmed as Ranbir
 Meghna Naidu as Meghna
 Pankhuri Awasthy Rode as Seher
 Mohit Abrol as Jo
 Scarlett Rose as Rose
 Ankit Patidar as Prateek

References 

Indian fantasy television series
MTV (Indian TV channel) original programming
Hindi-language television shows
2014 Indian television series debuts
2015 Indian television series endings
Indian drama television series
Indian teen drama television series
Television series about vampires
Television series about werewolves